Alexander Peya and Martin Slanar nwere the defending champions, but Peya chose not to participate. Slanar played alongside Karol Beck.
Treat Conrad Huey and Purav Raja won the title, beating Tomasz Bednarek and Mateusz Kowalczyk 6–1, 6–2 in the final.

Seeds

Draw

Draw

References
 Main Draw

Trofeo Paolo Corazzi - Doubles
Trofeo Paolo Corazzi